The Hunter 34 is an American sailboat, that was designed by Cortland Steck.

Production
The boat was built by Hunter Marine in the United States between 1983 and 1987, but it is now out of production.

Design
The Hunter 34 is a small recreational keelboat, built predominantly of fiberglass, with wood trim. It has a masthead B&R rig, an internally-mounted spade-type rudder and a fixed fin keel. It displaces  and carries  of iron ballast.

The boat is fitted with a Japanese Yanmar 3GM diesel engine.

Variants
Hunter 34
The boat has a PHRF racing average handicap of 153 with a high of 156 and low of 147.
Hunter 34 SD
The boat has a PHRF racing average handicap of 147 with a high of 159 and low of 135.

See also

List of sailing boat types

Related development
Hunter 36

Similar sailboats
Beneteau 331
Beneteau First Class 10
C&C 34
C&C 34/36
Catalina 34
Coast 34
Columbia 34
Columbia 34 Mark II
Creekmore 34
Crown 34
CS 34
Express 34
San Juan 34
Sea Sprite 34
Sun Odyssey 349
Tartan 34 C
Tartan 34-2
Viking 34

References

External links

Keelboats
1980s sailboat type designs
Sailing yachts
Sailboat types built by Hunter Marine
Sailboat type designs by Cortland Steck